Charisma simplex is a species of extremely small sea snail, a marine gastropod mollusk in the family Trochidae, the top snails.

Description
The height of the shell is 1 mm.

Distribution
This marine species is endemic to Australia and occurs off  New South Wales.

References

Laseron, C. 1954. Revision of the Liotiidae of New South Wales. The Australian Zoologist 12(1): 1-25, figs 1-49a
Iredale, T. & McMichael, D.F. 1962. A reference list of the marine Mollusca of New South Wales. Memoirs of the Australian Museum 11: 1-109
 Wilson, B. 1993. Australian Marine Shells. Prosobranch Gastropods. Kallaroo, Western Australia : Odyssey Publishing Vol. 1 408 pp.

External links
To World Register of Marine Species

simplex
Gastropods of Australia
Gastropods described in 1954